When Night Falls may refer to:

 When Night Falls (1985 film), an Israeli film
 When Night Falls (2012 film), a Chinese film